Weblin House is a historic home located at Virginia Beach, Virginia.  It was built in 1653, and is a -story, three bay, Colonial era vernacular brick farmhouse.  It is topped by a gambrel roof (the original gable roof was replaced after a fire) and has two massive exterior-end chimneys with a T-shaped stack and cap. A modern two-story brick wing is attached to the south end.

It was added to the National Register of Historic Places in 1974.

References

Houses on the National Register of Historic Places in Virginia
Colonial architecture in Virginia
Houses completed in 1700
Houses in Virginia Beach, Virginia
National Register of Historic Places in Virginia Beach, Virginia
1700 establishments in Virginia